Cassida canaliculata is a species of beetle in the leaf beetle family, that can be found in Central, West and Eastern Europe, as well as the Caucasus, Turkey, West Kazakhstan and North Italy.

Habitat
The species feeds on plants in the family Lamiaceae, such as Salvia pratensis and Salvia verticillata.

References

Cassidinae
Beetles described in 1781
Beetles of Asia
Beetles of Europe
Taxa named by Johann Nepomuk von Laicharting